James Burns (born 10 August 1943) is a Scottish former footballer.

Burns, a defender, began his career with Cowdenbeath. He made over 200 appearances for them before joining Clyde in 1967. Burns spent 9 years with the Glasgow club, and made over 300 appearances, making him one of the club's finest servants. Burns left Clyde in 1976 to join Stirling Albion. He retired in 1980, and became a coach at Stirling.

References 

1943 births
Living people
Footballers from Stirling
Scottish footballers
Association football defenders
Cowdenbeath F.C. players
Clyde F.C. players
Stirling Albion F.C. players
Scottish Football League players
Association football midfielders